The Paraguay Practical Shooting Association, Spanish Club Paraguayo de Tiro Practico, is the Paraguayan association for practical shooting under the International Practical Shooting Confederation.

External links 
 Official homepage of Practical Shooting Paraguay

References 

Regions of the International Practical Shooting Confederation
Sports organisations of Paraguay